Joachim von Düben the Elder (22 August 1671 – 30 November 1730) was a Swedish statesman, riksråd and hovkansler.

Joachim von Düben was the son of organist and composer Gustaf Düben and Emerentia Standaert, he was a grandson of the German-born Baroque composer Andreas Düben, and brother of lady-in-waiting Emerentia von Düben and Anders von Düben the Younger.

Von Düben anonymously published Uthwalde andelige sånger in 1725. 

Von Düben married Margareta Spegel in 1719, a daughter of Archbishop Haquin Spegel. He was in 1731, posthumously promoted, raised to comital rang.

References 

18th-century Swedish politicians
Joachim
1671 births
1730 deaths
Swedish nobility
Swedish people of German descent
Swedish people of Dutch descent